M-343 is a state trunkline highway in Kalamazoo County, Michigan. It runs for almost  along Gull Road between the northeast side of Kalamazoo and continues through rural areas on the way to Richland. The highway was created in January 2019 from a section of M-43 after that highway was rerouted in the aftermath of a series of jurisdictional transfers in downtown Kalamazoo. It had been a part of the state highway system for a century under its previous number until it was given its current designation.

Route description
M-343 starts where Gull Road intersects Riverview Drive east of the Kalamazoo River in Kalamazoo. From there, the highway follows Gull Road northeasterly past Riverside Cemetery and Borgess Medical Center on the northeast side of Kalamazoo. M-343 passes a number of commercial properties as it exits Kalamazoo and enters farmland. As the highway approaches Richland, there are additional businesses flanking the roadway. M-343 then turns due east along D Avenue for a short distance before terminating at an intersection with M-89 in the middle of Richland.

One section of M-343 was listed on the National Highway System (NHS) when the highway was part of M-43. This section is between the highway's western terminus at Riverview Drive and Sprinkle Road in Comstock Township. The NHS is a network of
a network of highways that are considered important to the country's economy, defense, and mobility.

History

No division of the original system included Gull Road between Kalamazoo and Richland, but it was included as a state reward road by the following year. In 1919, the state highway system was signposted for the first time, and Gull Road was first signed as a state highway that year as a part of M-43. The section closest to Kalamazoo was paved, while the remainder was a gravel roadway. By September 1924, it was shown as fully paved on state maps.

In 2018, planners with the City of Kalamazoo negotiated with MDOT a transfer of the jurisdiction of several streets in the city's downtown. The goal was to give the city greater control, allowing Kalamazoo to convert one-way streets to two-way traffic, lower traffic speeds and giving the city flexibility on permitting and parking. On January 7, 2019, the City of Kalamazooo accepted jurisdiction over those streets from MDOT, ending their status as state trunklines. As a result, MDOT rerouted M-43 out of downtown Kalamazoo, running along US Highway 131 west of Kalamazoo north to Plainwell and then southeasterly along M-89 back to its previous alignment at Richland. The segment of highway retained by the state along Gull Road was renumbered M-343 afterwards. The number was given an odd initial digit to signify that the highway is a spur of M-43; M-143 was taken by a highway in East Lansing. Signage reflecting the change was erected in August 2019.

Major intersections

See also

References

External links

M-343 at Michigan Highways

343
Transportation in Kalamazoo County, Michigan